Bright Kwame Appiah, known by his stage name Streetbeatz, is a Ghanaian record producer and creative director from Tema.

Early life 
Streetbeatz, (born March 14, 1992), the first of five children, was born in Koforidua and raised in Tema, to his mother Rosemond Adomakoa. Streetbeatz started music production at a very young age and continued throughout his educational career. He attended Tema Technical Institute.

Musical career
After Senior High School, Streetbeatz started to live his dream career as producer for many African artistes and the world beyond. He appeared in Groove Zone Records as a computer technician. It was through his computer technics that he met his former production teacher David Kyei (Kaywa) Of Highly Spiritual Entertainment. He also met musicians R2Bees, Sarkodie, Stonebwoy and Castro. He produced for Castro  “ENVY” that features BET Awards Winner Stonebwoy, after being impressed by his production skills. After this exposure, He produced a song for BET Awards Winner Stonebwoy “Twin City”. His third production was for Mugeez of the duo group R2Bees, after he also produced for BET Awards Winner Sarkodie “Adonai (Remix)” featuring Castro that became an instant hit and made StreetBeatz a household name within the Ghanaian music industry. In 2015, he got nominated as Producer Of The Year at the Ghana Music Awards.

Since 2018, StreetBeatz has produced records that has been featured on very successful albums by various renowned musicians worldwide. These include New Africa by Fuse ODG, Caribbean Monster by Admiral T, Anloga Junction by Stonebwoy, Kpanlogo by Darkovibes, El Shadai (Afro Sicilian) by Shadowboy Mysic, among others.

Awards and nominations

Production discography

Singles
2013
Stonebwoy: Same Girl
Castro: Envy Ft. Stonebwoy 
Stonebwoy: Twin City Ft. Humble Dis

2014
Sarkodie: Adonai Remix Feat Castro
Mugeez: Ragga
Edem: Zero To Hero Ft. Akwaboah
Jay Bagz:  Control 
Vibz: Baby Mama Ft. Sarkodie 
Stay Jay: Goodness & Mercy
Keche: Diabetes Ft. Bisa Kdei

2015
Jay Bagz: Crazy
Mac Nuru: Born To Win Ft Ruff n Smooth
Humble Dis: Bend Over Ft. Virgo
Piesie: Party Anthem

2016
Criss Waddle: Bie Gya Ft. Stonebwoy
Donzy: Club Ft. Sarkodie & Piesie
Omar Sterling: Friday Ft. Humble Dis & Teejay
Keche: ATINKA

2017
Dr Cryme: Dab Ft. Piesie
Nana Boroo: Akiti Ft. Donzy
Donzy: Pressure
R2Bees: Plantain Chips
Stonebwoy: Hero
Donzy: Wontia Ft. Flowking Stone
Stonebwoy: Bawasaaba

2018
Nana Boroo Feat. Sarkodie: Broken Heart
Keche: They Say
Keche: Atinka

2019
Stonebwoy Feat. Beenie Man: Shuga
Stonebwoy: Tuff Seed
OV Feat. Stonebwoy: Want Me
Admiral T Feat. Edem: Hello Hello
Fuse ODG: Happy Yourself
Stonebwoy: Big Boss
ZeeTM:Totori feat. Fancy Gadam

2020
Stonebwoy: African Party
Stonebwoy Feat. Diamond Platnumz: Black Maddona 
Adina Feat. Stonebwoy: Take Care Of You
Darkovibes Feat. King Promise: Inna Song
Darkovibes: Emotional
Shadowboy Myzic: COVID-19

References

1992 births
Living people
Ghanaian record producers
People from Tema